István Szívós Sr. (20 August 1920 – 22 June 1992) was a Hungarian water polo player. He was part of the Hungarian teams that won gold medals at the 1952 and 1956 Olympics and placed second in 1948. At the 1956 Olympics he also took part in the 200 m breaststroke swimming competition, but failed to reach the final. In 1997 he was inducted into the International Swimming Hall of Fame, one year later than his son István Jr., who competed in water polo at the 1968–1980 Olympics. He was given the honour to carry the national flag of Hungary at the opening ceremony of the 1980 Summer Olympics in Moscow, becoming the 14th water polo player to be a flag bearer at the opening and closing ceremonies of the Olympics.

Szívós was born in Szeged and took up swimming and waterpolo after his family moved to Budapest in the 1930s. During World War II he served in the Hungarian Army between 1942 and 1943, and then returned to sport. He retired in 1959 and later worked as a water polo coach in Hungary and Egypt (1964–66). In the late 1960s he brought his club Orvosegyetem SC to winning two national titles, one Hungarian Cup, and a third place in the European Cup tournament.

See also
 Hungary men's Olympic water polo team records and statistics
 List of Olympic champions in men's water polo
 List of Olympic medalists in water polo (men)
 List of members of the International Swimming Hall of Fame
 Blood in the Water match

References

External links
 

1920 births
1992 deaths
Hungarian male water polo players
Olympic swimmers of Hungary
Water polo players at the 1948 Summer Olympics
Water polo players at the 1952 Summer Olympics
Water polo players at the 1956 Summer Olympics
Swimmers at the 1956 Summer Olympics
Olympic gold medalists for Hungary in water polo
Olympic silver medalists for Hungary in water polo
Medalists at the 1956 Summer Olympics
Medalists at the 1952 Summer Olympics
Medalists at the 1948 Summer Olympics
Hungarian water polo coaches
Sportspeople from Szeged
20th-century Hungarian people